Another Day is an album by Canadian jazz pianist and composer Oscar Peterson, released in 1970.

Critical reception

AllMusic critic Ron Wynn wrote in his review: "He's made so many albums over the years, with a great deal sounding similar, that while they're never bad, sometimes they're for keyboard freaks only. That's something of the case here, although Peterson spins some fabulous solos.

Track listing 
 "Blues for Martha" (Peterson) – 5:11
 "Greensleeves" (Traditional, Peterson) – 4:27
 "I'm Old Fashioned" (Jerome Kern, Johnny Mercer) – 4:08
 "All the Things You Are" (Oscar Hammerstein II, Kern) – 6:13
 "Too Close for Comfort" (Jerry Bock, Larry Holofcener, George David Weiss) – 4:19
 "The Jamfs Are Coming" (Johnny Griffin) – 5:40
 "It Never Entered My Mind" (Richard Rodgers, Lorenz Hart) – 6:01
 "Carolina Shout" (James P. Johnson) – 3:17

Personnel

Performance 
 Oscar Peterson – piano
 George Mraz – double bass
 Ray Price – drums

References 

1970 albums
Oscar Peterson albums
MPS Records albums